The 1989 Citibank Open was a men's tennis tournament played on outdoor hard courts in Itaparica, Brazil that was part of the 1989 Nabisco Grand Prix. It was the fourth edition of the tournament and took place from 20 November through 25 November 1989. Third-seeded Martín Jaite won the singles title.

Finals

Singles
 Martín Jaite defeated  Jay Berger 6–4, 6–4
 It was Jaite's 4th singles title of the year and the 9th of his career.

Doubles
 Rick Leach /  Jim Pugh defeated  Jorge Lozano /  Todd Witsken 6–2, 7–6

References

Sul America Openn
Sul America Open
Itaparica